Frank Robert Ballard IV (born December 16, 1982) is an American country music singer-songwriter and guitarist. He has released two albums each for Reprise Records and Warner Bros. Records, and has charted eight singles on the Hot Country Songs charts.

Personal life
Ballard played college baseball at Mott Community College. He then continued to pursue college baseball by playing in the NCAA with Western Michigan University.

On March 12, 2017, Ballard married his girlfriend, Christina Murphy, owner of Old Smokeys Boots, a Nashville-based shoe and accessory store. On November 7, 2019, the couple announced they were expecting their first child. Their daughter, Pepper Lynn, was born on February 8, 2020.

Music career

In the summer of 2008 he signed up for Kenny Chesney's Next Big Star competition.  After winning the competition for Michigan in 2008, Ballard also opened shows for Chesney at Michigan venues.

He signed to Reprise Records Nashville in 2010 and released his debut single "Tell Me You Get Lonely." It received a four-star review from Kyle Ward of Roughstock, who praised Ballard's voice and called the song "an above average debut effort." The song debuted at Number 59 on the Hot Country Songs charts dated for the week ending June 12, 2010, and peaked at number 33 in early 2011.

On January 7, 2011, Ballard made his debut appearance at the Grand Ole Opry.

He released his second single, "A Buncha Girls", in early 2011. This song also made the top 40. Both of his singles are included on his self-titled debut album, released in May 2011.

Also in 2011, he opened for Lady Antebellum.

In 2013, Ballard moved to Warner Bros. Records and released his third single, "Helluva Life". This is the lead single to his second album, Sunshine & Whiskey. It became his first number 1 single in early 2014. Later in the year, the album's title track went to number 1. "Young & Crazy", the album's third single, also went to number 1.

The first single from Ballard's third album, "It All Started with a Beer", was released to country radio on November 16, 2015. The album, El Rio, was released on June 10, 2016. The album's second single, "Cigarette", released to country radio on August 8, 2016.

Ballard co-wrote "I Came to Git Down" on Big & Rich's 2014 album Gravity.

Concert tours
Supporting
 Own the Night Tour with Lady Antebellum (2011)
 Anything Goes Tour with Florida Georgia Line (2015)
 Still the Same Concert Tour with Sugarland  (2018)

Discography

Studio albums

Singles

A"It All Started with a Beer" did not enter the Hot 100, but peaked at number 2 on Bubbling Under Hot 100 Singles.

Music videos

References

External links
Official website

American country guitarists
American male guitarists
American country singer-songwriters
American male singer-songwriters
Country musicians from Michigan
People from Battle Creek, Michigan
Reprise Records artists
Warner Records artists
1982 births
Living people
Western Michigan Broncos baseball players
Singer-songwriters from Michigan
Guitarists from Michigan
21st-century American guitarists
21st-century American male singers
21st-century American singers